Maisie Gets Her Man is a 1942 American romance film directed by Roy Del Ruth and starring Ann Sothern and Red Skelton. It is the sixth of the ten-film Maisie series.

Plot

Cast
 Ann Sothern as Maisie Rivier
 Red Skelton as Herbert P. 'Hap' Hixby 
 Leo Gorcey as Cecil
 Allen Jenkins as Pappy Goodring
 Donald Meek as Mr. Stickwell
 Rags Ragland as Ears Cofflin
 Lloyd Corrigan as Mr. Marshall J. Denningham
 Walter Catlett as Jasper
 Fritz Feld as Professor Orco

Reception
According to MGM records, the film earned $824,000 in the US and Canada and $188,000 elsewhere, making the studio a profit of $258,000.

References

External links
 
 
 
 

1942 films
1942 comedy films
American black-and-white films
American comedy films
1940s English-language films
Films directed by Roy Del Ruth
Films scored by Lennie Hayton
Metro-Goldwyn-Mayer films
1940s American films